A Little Raw on Monday Mornings is an adult novel published by popular young adult author Robert Cormier in 1963.

1963 American novels
Novels by Robert Cormier